Eoman may refer to:
 Eoman people, an ethnic group of Australia
 Eoman language, a language of Australia

See also 
 Yeoman (disambiguation)

Language and nationality disambiguation pages